Sărmaș is a commune in Harghita County, Transylvania, Romania. Ethnic Romanians represent the majority. The commune is composed of five villages: Hodoșa (Gyergyóhodos), Fundoaia (Fundoja), Platonești (Kerekfenyő), Runc (Runk) and Sărmaș.

Demographics 
In 2002, 80.6% of inhabitants were Romanians and 19.2% Hungarians. All villages have a Romanian majority, with Hungarian residents concentrated in Sărmaș, Hodoșa and Runc.

Natives
 Nicolae Răcean

References

Communes in Harghita County
Localities in Transylvania